Norwegian Genealogical Society (NSF) is a genealogical society in Oslo, Norway.

It was founded on 22 October 1926 as the first exclusively Norwegian genealogical society. Among the founders were Stian Herlofsen Finne-Grønn, Christoffer Morgenstierne Munthe and Sigurd Segelcke Meidell. The two former had already published the periodical Norsk tidsskrift for genealogi, personalhistorie, biografi og litteraturhistorie since 1906; in 1927 the Norwegian Genealogical Society launched Norsk slektshistorisk tidsskrift as its official periodical. Their internal magazine is Genealogen. The organization also runs a genealogical library.

List of leaders
This is a list of leaders of the organization:
1926–1929 : Stian Herlofsen Finne-Grønn
1929–1940 : Halvdan Koht
1940–1943 : Sigurd Segelcke Meidell 
1943–1952 : Theodor Bull 
1952–1957 : Wilhelm Munthe 
1957–1968 : Otto Sverdrup Engelschiøn 
1968–1980 : Cornelius Severin Scheel Schilbred 
1980–1991 : Per Seland 
1991–1995 : Niels Christian Hjorth
1995–1999 : Tore Stenberg Falch 
1999–2007 : Lars Løberg 
2007–present : Håvard Blom

References

External links
Official site

Organisations based in Oslo
Organizations established in 1926
Genealogical societies